Cecil-Bishop (sometimes referred to by simply its inner communities, Cecil or Bishop) is a census-designated place (CDP) in Washington County, Pennsylvania, United States. The population was 2,730 at the 2020 census. The census-designated place encompasses two unincorporated communities: larger Cecil in the west and smaller Bishop in the east.

Geography
Cecil-Bishop is located at  (40.322303, -80.191384).

Demographics

At the 2000 census there were 2,585 people, 958 households, and 750 families living in the CDP. The population density was 1,016.8 people per square mile (392.9/km2). There were 992 housing units at an average density of 390.2/sq mi (150.8/km2).  The racial makeup of the CDP was 98.84% White, 0.31% African American, 0.04% Native American, 0.23% Asian, 0.12% from other races, and 0.46% from two or more races. Hispanic or Latino of any race were 0.74%.

Of the 958 households 36.2% had children under the age of 18 living with them, 66.9% were married couples living together, 8.7% had a female householder with no husband present, and 21.7% were non-families. 18.1% of households were one person and 7.5% were one person aged 65 or older. The average household size was 2.70 and the average family size was 3.10.

The age distribution was 25.7% under the age of 18, 7.0% from 18 to 24, 29.6% from 25 to 44, 26.7% from 45 to 64, and 11.0% 65 or older. The median age was 38 years. For every 100 females, there were 99.5 males. For every 100 females age 18 and over, there were 95.3 males.

The median household income was $50,607 and the median family income  was $55,900. Males had a median income of $45,865 versus $26,685 for females. The per capita income for the CDP was $19,639. About 6.8% of families and 7.5% of the population were below the poverty line, including 10.2% of those under age 18 and 8.6% of those age 65 or over.

References

Census-designated places in Washington County, Pennsylvania
Pittsburgh metropolitan area
Census-designated places in Pennsylvania